{{Infobox officeholder 
| name           = Ahmad Hosseini Khorasani
| image          = Seyyed Ahmad Hosseini Khorasani.jpg
| office1 = Member of the Assembly of Experts 
| term_start1 = 24 May 2016
| term_end1 = 
| majority1 = 1,180,249
| constituency1 = Razavi Khorasan Province
| Title          = Ayatollah
| other_names    =  <big>سید احمد حسینی خراسانی</big>
| religion       = Twelver Shi'a Islam
| alias          = 
| location       =  Qom
| ordination     = 
| post           = 
| birth_date  = 1959
| birth_place = Shirvan, Iran
| death_date  = 
| death_place = 
| website     = 
}}
Seyyed Ahmad Hosseini Khorasani''' (Persian: سید احمد حسینی خراسانی) is an Iranian Twelver Shia ayatollah who was born in 1959 Fajr-Abad (Shirvan).He is a member of Guardian Council and also representative of Razavi Khorasan Province people in Assembly of Experts.

Seyyed Ahmad Hosseini-Khorasani whose current dwelling place is in Qom, is the representative of Khorasan Razavi people in the Assembly of experts. This Shia cleric who is the son of Mirza-Arab, went to "Ayatollah-Hakim Hawzah" in Shirvan, afterwards departed to Mashhad (seminary); and was educating by the side of scholars/teachers such as: Falsafi, Mortazavi and RezaZadeh; he was also simultaneously teaching in Hawzah and Mashhad University of Ferdosi. Likewise, Hosseini-Khorasani immigrated to Qom, and participated at the classes of Shia scholars amongst: Hasanzadeh Amoli, Javadi-Amoli, etc. So far, there have been published more than 50 scientific articles from this Iranian ayatollah.

See also 
 Assembly of Experts
 Expediency Discernment Council
 Guardian Council
 Ahmad Alamolhoda
 Mohammad-Taqi Mesbah-Yazdi

References 

Members of the Assembly of Experts
Iranian ayatollahs
Assembly of Experts
Living people
1959 births
People from Mashhad